Prestwich Heys A.F.C. is a semi-professional football club based in Prestwich, Greater Manchester, England.

Heys now have a Youth Team formed in the 2020–21 season ran by Nick Simister.

League history
1968–69 – Joined the Lancashire Combination
1969–70 – Lancashire Combination Runners-Up
1970–71 – Lancashire Combination Champions
1971–72 – Joined the Cheshire County League
1978–79 – Dropped down to become founder members of Division Two
1982–83 – Founder Members of the North West Counties League
1985–86 – Final season in the North West Counties League
1986–87 – Joined the Manchester Football League Division One
1987–88 – Manchester Football League Division One Champions
1987–88 – Promoted to the Premier Division
1995–96 – Relegated to Division One
1996–97 – Manchester Football League Division One Champions
1996–97 – Promoted to the Premier Division
2003–04 – Premier Division Runners-Up
2004–05 – Premier Division Champions
2005–06 – Premier Division Champions
2006–07 – Premier Division Champions
2015–16 – Premier Division Champions
2016–17 – Joined North West Counties League Division One

Records
League Positions:
1st in the Lancashire Combination 1970–71
4th in the North West Counties League Division Three 1982–83
1st in the Manchester Football League Premier Division 2004–05, 2005–06, 2006–07 and 2015–16

FA Cup:
Second Round Qualifying v Mossley 1973–74 (lost 3–2)
Second Round Qualifying v Stalybridge Celtic 1978–79 (lost 4–1)
Second Round Qualifying v Southport, 1983–84 (lost 1–0)

FA Amateur Cup:
Quarter-final v Enfield 1969–70 (lost 2–0)

FA Trophy
Second Round Qualifying v Leeds & Carnegie College 1974–75 (lost 2–1)

FA Vase
Preliminary Round (on 7 occasions)

LWC Drinks Cup (Inter league cup)

Winners 2017-18 v Cammel Laird (won 2-1)

External links
Official Prestwich Heys Website
Official Prestwich Heys Juniors Website

Twitter @PrestwichHeysFc 
Instagram Prestwichheysafc 
Facebook PrestwichHeys #prideofprestwich

Association football clubs established in 1938
Football clubs in England
Football clubs in the Metropolitan Borough of Bury
Lancashire Combination
1938 establishments in England
Prestwich
North West Counties Football League clubs
Manchester Football League
Cheshire County League clubs